Khazia Hislop (born June 30, 1998) is a British-born Trinidadian artistic gymnast who currently lives in the United States. She was selected for the 2014 Commonwealth Games but withdrew to injury. Hislop trains at Brestyan's Gymnastics alongside Talia Chiarelli and Aly Raisman.

References

1998 births
Trinidad and Tobago female artistic gymnasts
Living people
Sportspeople from London